The Stockhorn is a mountain located south of Thun in the Bernese Oberland. It is also the name of several other mountains:

Stockhorn (Baltschiedertal), north of Baltschieder in Valais
Stockhorn (Zermatt), south of Zermatt in Valais
Stockhorn (Binntal), south of Binn in Valais